Scolopendra abnormis, the Serpent Island centipede, is a species of centipede in the family Scolopendridae that is endemic to Mauritius. It only occurs on two outlying islands, Round Island and Serpent Island. On Serpent Island it is very common, reaching densities of 12 adults per square metre in suitable habitat.

Evolution
Ancestors of Scolopendra abnormis likely colonized Mauritius a few million years ago but became extinct there because of introduced predators, with only relict populations surviving on outlying islands. Scolopendra abnormis are unable to swim and probably reached their current habitats by rafting or during ice ages when Round and Serpent Islands were connected to Mauritius through land bridges.

Description
Scolopendra abnormis grow to at least  in length, with the specimens from Serpent Island being slightly larger than those from Round Island. Their overall colour is yellowish. They do not show escape reactions when exposed.

Ecology
Scolopendra abnormis are typically found under rocks or between slabs of volcanic tuff (Round Island), or in loose networks of burrows in humid peat-like soil between slabs of rock (Serpent Island). They are nocturnal carnivores that feed on insects and carcasses. They can inflict a painful bite on humans. Scolopendra abnormis are preyed upon by Serpent Island geckos and Round Island skinks.

References

abnormis
Arthropods of Africa
Endemic fauna of Mauritius
Animals described in 1996
Taxonomy articles created by Polbot